The Maine Black Bears represented the University of Maine in Women's Hockey East Association during the 2016–17 NCAA Division I women's ice hockey season.

Offseason
June 30: The Maine Black Bears have 21 named to the WHEA All-Academic All-Star Team.

Recruiting

Roster

2016-17 Black Bears

se

Schedule

|-
!colspan=12 style=" "| Regular Season

Awards and honors

Tereza Vanišová was selected as WHEA Co-Rookie of the Month for November 
Brooke Stacey, F - WHEA All-Star Honorable Mention

References

Maine
Maine Black Bears women's ice hockey seasons
2016 in sports in Maine
2017 in sports in Maine